Alan Coren (27 June 1938 – 18 October 2007) was an English humourist, writer and satirist who was a regular panellist on the BBC radio quiz The News Quiz and a team captain on BBC television's Call My Bluff. Coren was also a journalist, and for almost a decade was the editor of Punch magazine.

Early life
Alan Coren was born into an Orthodox Jewish family in East Barnet, Hertfordshire, in 1938, the son of builder and plumber Samuel Coren and his wife Martha, a hairdresser. In the introduction to Chocolate and Cuckoo Clocks: The Essential Alan Coren, Giles and Victoria Coren conclude that Samuel Coren was "an odd job man really" and had also apparently been a debt collector.

Education
Coren was educated at Osidge Primary School and East Barnet Grammar School, followed by Wadham College at the University of Oxford to which he gained a scholarship, and where he got a first in English in 1960. After taking a master's degree he studied for a doctorate in modern American literature at Yale and the University of California, Berkeley.

Life and career
Coren considered an academic career but instead decided to become a writer and journalist. In his later life he distanced himself from his Jewish heritage, being 'slightly embarrassed' and stating in an interview with The Independent, 'I haven't been Jewish for years!'.

He began this career by selling articles to Punch and was later offered a full-time job there. At this time he also wrote for The New Yorker.

Magazine editorships 

In 1966, he became Punchs literary editor, becoming deputy editor in 1969 and editor in 1977. He remained as editor until 1987 when the circulation began to decline.

During the week in which he took over the editorship, The Jewish Chronicle published a profile of him. His response was to rush around the office, waving a copy of the relevant edition, saying: "This is ridiculous – I haven't been Jewish for years!"

When Coren left Punch in 1987, he became editor of The Listener, continuing in that role until 1989.

Columns

From 1971 to 1978, Coren wrote a television review column for The Times.

From 1972 to 1976 he wrote a humour column for the Daily Mail. He also wrote for The Observer, Tatler and The Times.

From 1984, Coren worked as a television critic for The Mail on Sunday until he moved as a humorous columnist to the Sunday Express, which he left in 1996. In 1989, he began to contribute a column in The Times, which continued for the rest of his life.

Broadcasting

Coren began his broadcasting career in 1977. He was invited to be one of the regular panellists on BBC Radio 4's new satirical quiz show, The News Quiz. He continued on The News Quiz until the year he died.

From 1996 to 2004 he was one of two team captains on the UK panel game Call My Bluff.

Scriptwriting

In 1978 he wrote The Losers, an unsuccessful sitcom about a wrestling promoter starring Leonard Rossiter and Alfred Molina.

Books

Coren published about twenty books during his life, many of which were collections of his newspaper columns, such as Golfing for Cats and The Cricklewood Diet.

From 1976 to 1983, he wrote the Arthur series of children's books.

One of his most successful books, The Collected Bulletins of Idi Amin (a collection of his Punch articles about Amin) was rejected for publication in the United States on the grounds of racial sensitivity. These Bulletins were later made into a comedy album, The Collected Broadcasts of Idi Amin with the actor John Bird. After the Tanzanian capture of Kampala in 1979 the American journalist Art Barrett discovered a copy of Coren's book on Idi Amin's bedside table.

Coren's other books include The Dog It Was That Died (1965), The Sanity Inspector (1974), All Except The Bastard (1978), The Lady from Stalingrad Mansions (1978), Rhinestone as Big as the Ritz (1979), Tissues for Men (1981), Bumf (1984), Seems Like Old Times: a Year in the Life of Alan Coren (1989), More Like Old Times (1990), A Year in Cricklewood (1991), Toujours Cricklewood? (1993), Alan Coren's Sunday Best (1993), A Bit on the Side (1995), Alan Coren Omnibus (1996), The Cricklewood Dome (1998), The Cricklewood Tapestry (2002) and Waiting for Jeffrey (2002). Coren's final book, 69 For One, was published late in 2007.

Honours

In 1973, Coren became the Rector of the University of St Andrews, after John Cleese. He held the position until 1976.

Later years
In May 2006, Coren was bitten by an insect that gave him septicaemia, which led to his developing necrotising fasciitis.

Death
Coren died from lung cancer in 2007 at his home in north London. His body was buried at Hampstead Cemetery in north London. He was survived by his wife Anne (née Kasriel), a consultant at Moorfields Eye Hospital, whom he married in 1963, and their two children, Giles and Victoria, who are both journalists. Coren's cousin Michael Coren, who emigrated to Canada to become a journalist, credited him with much help. 

An anthology of his writings, called The Essential Alan Coren – Chocolate and Cuckoo Clocks and edited by his children, was published on 2 October 2008.

References

External links

Alan Coren at The Times

1938 births
2007 deaths
British Jews
British Jewish writers
Alumni of Wadham College, Oxford
Deaths from cancer in England
English humorists
English male journalists
English magazine editors
English satirists
English Jewish writers
Rectors of the University of St Andrews
People educated at East Barnet School
Burials at Hampstead Cemetery
20th-century English non-fiction writers
21st-century English writers
Punch (magazine) people
Writers from London
Yale Graduate School of Arts and Sciences alumni
UC Berkeley College of Letters and Science alumni
Jewish humorists
Jewish English comedians
Coren family